is a former Japanese Nippon Professional Baseball player.

External links

1967 births
Living people
Baseball people from Tokyo
Japanese baseball players
Nippon Professional Baseball outfielders
Hiroshima Toyo Carp players
Seibu Lions players
Japanese baseball coaches
Nippon Professional Baseball coaches
People from Nerima